Aslanbek is a given name. Notable people with this name include:

Aslanbek Alborov (born 1991), Azerbaijani wrestler
Aslanbek Bulatsev (born 1963), Russian politician
Aslanbek Dzitiyev (born 1982), Russian taekwondo practitioner
Aslanbek Ediev (born 1970), Russian weightlifter
Aslanbek Fidarov (1973–2020), Ukrainian wrestler
Aslanbek Khantsev (born 1960), Russian footballer and coach
Aslanbek Khushtov (born 1980), Russian wrestler
Aslanbek Sapiev (born 1993), Russian Paralympic footballer
Aslanbek Shymbergenov (born 1993), Kazakhstani boxer
Aslanbek Sikoyev (born 1995), Russian footballer
Aslanbek Sotiev (born 1999), Russian freestyle wrestler
Aslanbek Yenaldiev (1947–2015), Russian weightlifter
Aslanbek Zikreev (born 1995), Russian kickboxer

See also

Arslanbey, Kartepe